David F. Hoy Field, usually referred to simply as Hoy Field, is a baseball field at Cornell University in Ithaca, New York, where the Big Red baseball team plays.

Description
Hoy Field is located just west of Schoellkopf Field and east of the Engineering Quad on the southern end of Cornell's campus.  The dimensions of the field from home plate to the outfield fence are 315 feet in left field, 405 feet in center field and 325 feet in right field.  The seating capacity of Hoy Field is about 500.  For many years the Bacon Cage, an indoor batting practice facility that was also used as an indoor golf driving range, was located between Schoellkopf Field and Hoy Field.  However, Bacon Cage was demolished to build a parking garage and new press box on the west side of Schoellkopf Field.

Hoy Field has batting facilities that are dedicated in memory of Kerry Brooks, a 1990 graduate of Cornell and a former "Big Red" co-captain.

History

Background
Cornell's previous baseball field was Percy Field, which stood at the current location of Ithaca High School from the 1890s until 1922.  The metal bleachers from Percy Field were preserved and moved to the new baseball field.

David F. Hoy
The new baseball field was built at the urging of baseball advisor David "Davy" Hoy. The dedication took place on April 22, 1922 with a parade and band concert. Hoy threw out the first pitch on the field; the ball he used is preserved in the Kroch Library collections. Hoy, an alumnus and university registrar since 1894, had served the university's baseball advisor for thirty years, and traveled south with the team for spring training each year. The baseball field was named after Hoy in October 1923. 

Later, Hoy was injured in a 1929 bus accident in Virginia while riding with the baseball team, and he died in December 1930 at age 67. Cornell's fight song, Give My Regards to Davy references "Davy" Hoy prominently.

Notable events
On April 21, 1923, Columbia pitcher Lou Gehrig struck out ten Big Red players and hit a "legendary" home run, which may be the longest home run in Hoy Field history. A 2015 analysis suggests that Gehrig's home run was "the equivalent of hitting a home run either to the top of Rhodes Hall, or over it into the woods behind it."

In 1947 it was proposed that the School of Industrial and Labor Relations be housed in a new building that would be built partly over the field, but protests from students and alumni blocked the project. 

In 2006, the grass turf was removed and replaced with FieldTurf, which has many grass-like properties.  In 2012, the field hosted the 2012 Ivy League Baseball Championship Series, in which Cornell defeated Dartmouth two games to one.

Relocation
The 2008 Campus Master Plan called for the relocation of Hoy Field, and its replacement with an open space called Hoy Green, in anticipation of future construction. The field and several other athletic facilities would be moved to the edge of the Ithaca campus, off Game Farm Road in the Town of Ithaca. The 160-acre site  would be near existing facilities including the Reis Tennis Center, Oxley Equestrian Center, and the Robinson Softball Complex, and adjacent to the McGovern Athletics Complex.

The new facility would retain Hoy Field's capacity while adding lighting as well as a support building which would include new locker rooms, batting cages, and a press box. The Town of Ithaca approved the plans and construction began in 2022. In October, Cornell announced that the new field would be named after longtime donor Rich Booth, a 1982 graduate and former pitcher, who had earlier endowed Cornell’s head baseball coaching position in memory of coach Ted Thoren.

See also
 List of NCAA Division I baseball venues

References

External links
 Cornell Big Red: Hoy Field

College baseball venues in the United States
Sports venues in New York (state)
Cornell Big Red baseball
Cornell Big Red sports venues
1922 establishments in New York (state)
Sports venues completed in 1922